ReMastered: The Miami Showband Massacre is a 2019 documentary film about the Miami Showband killings, an attack on the cabaret band The Miami Showband on 31 July 1975.

Premise
The documentary explores the Miami Showband killings, an attack on The Miami Showband on 31 July 1975 by the loyalist paramilitary group Ulster Volunteer Force (UVF). The Miami Showband were at the time one of Ireland's most popular cabaret bands, and in the attack five people were killed, including three members of the band.

Cast
 Stephen Travers
 Bertie Ahern
 Alan Brecknell
 Anne Cadwallader
 Fred Holroyd
 Chris Hudson
 Winston Irvine
 Des Lee
 Ken Livingstone
 Michael Mates
 Ray Millar
 Raymond White
 The Beatles
 Tony Blair
 Tony Geraghty

References

External links

 
 
 

2019 documentary films
2019 films
Netflix original documentary films
2010s English-language films